Christiane Wilhelmine Sophie von Kühn (17 March 1782 – 19 March 1797) was the love interest and eventual fiancée of the German Romantic poet and philosopher Friedrich von Hardenberg, known simply as Novalis. Her image famously appears in Novalis’ Hymns to the Night, a foundational text of the literary movement known as German Romanticism.

Although Novalis's love for Sophie has assumed mythic proportions, their time together was short and uneventful. The two met on 17 November 1794 when Novalis was twenty-two and Sophie was only twelve. They became engaged on Sophie's thirteenth birthday 17 March 1795. Sophie became sick in November 1795, and her sickness continued until her death at the age of 15 in March 1797. The loss of Sophie brought about a deep period of mourning and suffering in Novalis' life. Even so, he became engaged to Julie von Charpentier in December 1798.

The depth of Sophie's love for Novalis is uncertain given her young age. Some of her diary entries, found in Wm. O’Brien's Novalis: Signs of Revolution, provide some insight into her relationship with Novalis:

1 March.  Today Hartenberch visited again nothing happened.
11 March. We were alone today and nothing at all happened.
12 March. Today was like yesterday nothing at all happened.
13 March. Today was repentance day and Hartenb. was here.
14 March. Today Hartenber. was still here he got a letter from his brother.

Sophie had a sister, Caroline von Kühn, and a stepsister, Wilhelmine von Thümmel.

Ludwig Tieck's biography of Novalis describes Sophie, saying: "Even as a child, she gave an impression which--because it was so gracious and spiritually lovely--we must call superearthly or heavenly, while through this radiant and almost transparent countenance of hers we would be struck with the fear that it was too tender and delicately woven for this life, that it was death or immortality which looked at us so penetratingly from those shining eyes; and only too often a rapid withering motion turned our fear into an actual reality." von Kühn and Novalis' relationship is the focus of the 1995 novel The Blue Flower by Penelope Fitzgerald.

References 
 O’Brien, Wm. Arctander, Novalis: Signs of Revolution. Durham: Duke University Press, 1997.
 Regula Fankhauser, Des Dichters Sophia, 1997.

1782 births
1797 deaths
18th-century German people
18th-century German women
18th-century deaths from tuberculosis
German untitled nobility
People from Thuringia
Tuberculosis deaths in Germany
Novalis